Alwan may refer to:

 Alwan (newspaper)
 Alwan (surname)

See also
 
 Alvan (disambiguation)